Statistics of the 1992 Cameroonian Premier League season.

Overview
Racing Bafoussam won the championship.

References
Cameroon 1992 - List of final tables (RSSSF)

Cam
Cam
1
Elite One seasons